The 2020 Empress's Cup was the 42nd season of the Japanese women's football main cup competition. NTV Beleza won the competition after defeating Urawa Red 4–3 at the final, winning their fourth consecutive and 15th overall title.

Matches especially the semi-finals and final were streamed live on JFA TV.

Calendar and format 
Below are the dates for each round as given by the official schedule:

First round
32 teams competed in this round.

|colspan="3" style="background-color:blue1|5 December 2020

|-
|colspan="3" style="background-color:blue1|6 December 2020

|}

Second round
The remaining 16 teams played in this round.

|colspan="3" style="background-color:blue1|12 December 2020

|-
|colspan="3" style="background-color:blue1|13 December 2020

|}

Quarter-final

|colspan="3" style="background-color:blue1|19 December 2020

|-
|colspan="3" style="background-color:blue1|20 December 2020

|}

Semi-final

|}

Final
The final was played on 29 December 2020 at the Sanga Stadium in Kameoka, Kyoto

|}

References 

Empress's Cup
2020 in Japanese women's football